Geophis sanniolus, commonly known as the pygmy snail-eating snake or the pygmy snail sucker, is a species of small snake in the family Colubridae. The species is endemic to Central America and southeastern Mexico.

Geographic range
G. sanniolus is found in Belize, Guatemala, and the Mexican states of Campeche, Quintana Roo, and Yucatán.

Habitat
Geophis sanniolus is a relatively common snake that occurs in tropical semi-deciduous forest and thorn forest, and also in degraded forest.

Reproduction
G. sanniolus reaches sexual maturity in eight months and produces a single clutch per year.

Subspecies
Two subspecies are recognized as being valid, including the nominotypical subspecies.

Geophis sanniolus neilli 
Geophis sanniolus sanniolus 

Nota bene: A trinomial authority or a binomial authority in parentheses indicates that the subspecies or species was originally described in a genus other than Geophis.

Etymology
The subspecific name, neilli, is in honor of American herpetologist Wilfred T. Neill.

References

Further reading
Cope ED (1866). "Fifth Contribution to the Herpetology of Tropical America". Proc. Acad. Nat. Sci. Philadelphia 1886: 317–323. (Mesopeltis sanniolus, new species, p. 318).
Boulenger GA (1896). Catalogue of the Snakes in the British Museum (Natural History). Volume III., Containing the Colubridæ (Opisthoglyphæ and Proteroglyphæ), Amblycephalidæ, and Viperidæ. London: Trustees of the British Museum (Natural History). (Taylor and Francis, printers). xiv + 727 pp. + Plates I-XXV. (Leptognathus sanniola, p. 459).
Heimes, Peter (2016). Snakes of Mexico: Herpetofauna Mexicana Vol. I. Frankfurt, Germany: Chimaira. 572 pp. .

Geophis
Snakes of Central America
Reptiles of Belize
Reptiles of Guatemala
Reptiles of Mexico
Reptiles described in 1866
Taxa named by Edward Drinker Cope